Central District (Sirik County) (meaning "Desert") is a district (bakhsh) in Sirik County, Hormozgan Province, Iran. At the 2006 census, its population was 38,251, in 6,623 families.  The District has 2 cities: Sirik and Kuhestak.  The District has 3 rural districts (dehestan): Bemani Rural District, Byaban Rural District, and Sirik Rural District.

References 

Districts of Hormozgan Province
Sirik County